Conoeca is a genus of moths in the family Psychidae.

Species
Conoeca guildingi  Scott, 1864 (Australia)
Conoeca psammogona  (Meyrick, 1931) (Madagascar)

Unplaced taxa
Conoeca charitoides  (Meyrick, 1893) (Australia)
Conoeca sticktoptera  (Lower, 1920) (Australia)

References

Psychidae
Psychidae genera